Wrockwardine Wood (pronounced "Rock-war-dine") was originally a detached piece of woodland, then a township, formerly belonging to the manor and parish of Wrockwardine. Wrockwardine is located approximately 7 miles west from Wrockwardine Wood.

Wrockwardine Wood is located in north east Telford in Shropshire and is bordered by Donnington, St Georges, Trench, The Nabb and Oakengates. The local government parish of Wrockwardine Wood and Trench comprises most of the Church of England parish of Wrockwardine Wood.  In the eighteenth century industrial revolution Wrockwardine Wood was inhabited by coal and iron mine workers and their families.  So many people had become Primitive Methodists that the Church of England set up a new parish in 1833 and built a very attractive red brick church (Holy Trinity).  The 2 Methodist chapels recently closed, being replaced by Oakengates United Church (Methodist and United Reformed Church.)

Wrockwardine Wood & Trench Parish Council has a Labour Party majority.

The Snake
"The Snake" is a small woodland area in Wrockwardine Wood. It was also known as the Cinder Hill for many years. It consists of one main lake and many small swamps along with a large field and many pathways connecting Wrockwardine Wood to Donnington.

The route of the Donnington Canal ran through the southern section of the area, and there was also a Tin Chapel (the "dissident Methodist" Central Hall) that sat on top of one of the many "hills", but was dismantled during the 1980s.

The area is commonly known as "The Snake" because of its winding paths which  locals say reminded them of a snake. The surrounding woods and clearings landscaped by Wrekin Council are signposted as "The Central Hall".

The area is used by many people, especially those travelling to and from schools and the supermarket in Donnington Wood on the site of a former pit mound known as the Nobby Bank. The hilly wooded Cockshutt is nearby. Wrekin Council preserved these old industrial places as countryside.

Education
Wrockwardine Wood is home of secondary school Telford Priory School, in New Road, created in 2015 from the amalgamation of Wrockwardine Wood Art Academy (founded originally as Wrockwardine Wood Secondary School) and Sutherland Co-operative Academy.

Notable people
Champion jockey Sir Gordon Richards (1904-1986) grew up in childhood at Wrockwardine Wood where he lived at 1 The Limes, a row of cottages in Plough Road built on land bought by his mother and still standing. He rode helping his parents' pony and trap service to Oakengates station.

See also
Listed buildings in Wrockwardine Wood and Trench

References

Villages in Shropshire
Telford